This is a list of rulers and office-holders of Comoros.

Heads of state 
Heads of state of the Comoros
Presidents of Comoros

Heads of government 
Heads of government of the Comoros

Colonial governors 
Colonial heads of the Comoros

See also 
List of office-holders
Sultans on the Comoros

Comoros
Comoros-related lists